Nada Hafez (born 28 August 1997) is an Egyptian sabre fencer. She competed at the 2016 Summer Olympics and 2020 Summer Olympics in Sabre.

Career
In 2014, she became a member of the Egyptian National Senior Fencing Sabre Women´s Team. In 2015, she won her first Egyptian Senior Women´s Sabre National Republic Competition. 

In 2016, she qualified through the African zonal qualification (Algeria) to the 2016 Rio Olympics and in 2021, she qualified for the Tokyo Olympics. Nada won one silver (2018) and two bronze (2019, 2014) at the African zonal championship. She also won the bronze medal at the Belgium Tournoi satellite.

References

External links
 International Fencing Federation
 http://www.fencingegypt.com/EFF/Player/View.aspx?ObjectID=2898 
 ندي حافظ وشروق فؤاد يتقاسمان لقب ملكة الجمال في استفتاء "تتويج للأفضل في الرياضة المصرية" 

1997 births
Living people
Egyptian female sabre fencers
Fencers at the 2016 Summer Olympics
Olympic fencers of Egypt
Fencers at the 2020 Summer Olympics
20th-century Egyptian women
21st-century Egyptian women